Walnut Creek is a concert DVD released on August 8, 2008, by the rock band Phish. It was performed on July 22, 1997, at Walnut Creek Amphitheatre in Raleigh, North Carolina during a stormy night, the second show of their 1997 U.S. summer tour.

During the first set, lightning struck the stage three different times, hitting the stage during the band's rendition of "Taste," forcing the group to cut the set short and leave the stage. After a one-hour intermission (purposely extended in order to let the storm pass), the group returned to the stage for an additional 90 minutes of music. 
 
The DVD footage is taken from the venue jumbo screen video feed displayed in concert during the show.

This concert is also available as a download in FLAC and MP3 formats at LivePhish.com.  As a bonus, the download includes You Enjoy Myself recorded at Walnut Creek on June 16, 1995, with guest Boyd Tinsley of the Dave Matthews Band on violin.

Track listing

Disc one
 "Runaway Jim" (Abrahams, Anastasio) - 10:10 ->
 "My Soul" (Chenier) - 5:36
 "Water in the Sky" (Anastasio, Marshall) - 2:46
 "Stash" (Anastasio, Marshall) - 12:33
 "Bouncing Around the Room" (Anastasio, Marshall) - 3:44
 "Vultures" (Anastasio, Herman, Marshall) - 7:09
 "Bye Bye Foot" (Fishman) - 3:59
 "Taste" (Anastasio, Fishman, Gordon, Marshall, McConnell) - 10:19

Disc two
 "Down With Disease" (Anastasio, Marshall) - 20:17 ->
 "Mike's Song" (Gordon) - 14:35 ->
 "Simple" (Gordon) - 9:30 ->
 "I Am Hydrogen" (Anastasio, Daubert, Marshall) - 3:02
 "Weekapaug Groove" (Anastasio, Fishman, Gordon, McConnell) - 11:16
 "Hello My Baby" (Emerson, Howard, Singer) - 2:02
 "When the Circus Comes" (Hidalgo, Pérez) - 5:04
 "Harry Hood" (Anastasio, Fishman, Gordon, Long, McConnell) - 11:32

Left Nuts Bonus Disc
All songs recorded June 16, 1995 except "Reba," which was recorded June 29, 1994.
 "Runaway Jim" (Abrahams, Anastasio) - 31:00 ->
 "Free" (Anastasio, Marshall) - 8:35
 "Reba" (Anastasio) - 15:36
 "Dog Faced Boy" (Anastasio, Fishman, Marshall, McConnell) - 2:14 ->
 "Catapult" (Gordon) - 0:48 ->
 "Split Open and Melt" (Anastasio) - 15:11
 "Carolina" (Traditional) - 1:42

Personnel
Phish
Trey Anastasio - guitars, lead vocals, acapella vocals on "Hello My Baby"
Page McConnell - keyboards, backing vocals, acapella vocals on "Hello My Baby"
Mike Gordon - bass, backing vocals, lead vocals on "Mike's Song", acapella vocals on "Hello My Baby"
Jon Fishman - drums, backing vocals, lead vocals on "Bye Bye Foot", co-lead vocals on "Taste", acapella vocals on "Hello My Baby"

Phish video albums
Phish live albums
2008 live albums
2008 video albums
Live video albums